Tiilikainen is a Finnish surname. Notable people with the surname include:

Kim Tiilikainen (born 1975), Finnish tennis player and coach
Kimmo Tiilikainen (born 1966), Finnish politician
Paavo Tiilikainen (1923–2007), Finnish politician
Teija Tiilikainen, Finnish political scientist
Tommi Tiilikainen (born 1987), Finnish volleyball coach and player